Prunus serotina, commonly called black cherry, wild black cherry, rum cherry, or mountain black cherry, is a deciduous tree or shrub of the genus Prunus. Despite being called black cherry, it is not very closely related to the commonly cultivated cherries such as sweet cherry (P. avium), sour cherry (P. cerasus) and Japanese flowering cherries (P. serrulata, P. speciosa, P. sargentii, P. incisa, etc.) which belong to Prunus subg. Cerasus. Instead, P. serotina belongs to Prunus subg. Padus, a subgenus also including Eurasian bird cherry (P. padus) and chokecherry (P. virginiana). The species is widespread and common in North America and South America.

Black cherry is closely related to the chokecherry (P. virginiana); chokecherry, however, tends to be shorter (a shrub or small tree) and has smaller, less glossy leaves.

Description
Fall leaf color is yellow to red. The flowers give rise to reddish-black "berries" (drupes) fed on by birds,  in diameter.

For about its first decade the bark of a black cherry tree is thin, smooth, and banded, resembling a birch. A mature tree has very broken, dark gray to black bark. The leaves are long and shiny, resembling a sourwood's. An almond-like odour is released when a young twig is scratched and held close to the nose, revealing minute amounts of cyanide compounds produced and stored by the plant as a defense mechanism against herbivores.

Biochemistry 
Like apricots and apples, the seeds of black cherries contain cyanogenic glycosides, compounds that can be converted into cyanide, such as amygdalin. These compounds release hydrogen cyanide when the seed is ground or minced, which releases enzymes that break down the compounds. These enzymes include amygdalin beta-glucosidase, prunasin beta-glucosidase and mandelonitrile lyase. In contrast, although the flesh of cherries also contains these compounds, it does not contain the enzymes needed to produce cyanide, so the flesh is safe to eat.

The foliage, particularly when wilted, also contains cyanogenic glycosides, which convert to hydrogen cyanide if eaten by animals. Farmers are recommended to remove any trees that fall in a field containing livestock, because the wilted leaves could poison the animals. Removal is not always practical, though, because they often grow in very large numbers on farms, taking advantage of the light brought about by mowing and grazing. Entire fencerows can be lined with this poisonous tree, making it difficult to monitor all the branches falling into the grazing area. Black cherry is a leading cause of livestock illness, and grazing animals' access to it should be limited.

Subdivisions

Prunus serotina has the following subspecies and varieties:
Prunus serotina subsp. capuli (Cav. ex Spreng.) McVaugh – central + southern Mexico
Prunus serotina subsp. eximia (Small) McVaugh – Texas
Prunus serotina subsp. hirsuta (Elliott) McVaugh (syn. Prunus serotina var. alabamensis (C. Mohr) Little) – southeastern United States
Prunus serotina subsp. serotina – Canada, United States, Mexico, Guatemala
Prunus serotina subsp. virens (Wooton & Standl.) McVaugh – southwestern United States, northern + central Mexico
Prunus serotina var. virens (Wooton & Standl.) McVaugh
Prunus serotina var. rufula (Wooton & Standl.) McVaugh

Ecology 

Prunus serotina is a pioneer species. In the Midwest, it is seen growing mostly in old fields with other sunlight-loving species, such as black walnut, black locust, and hackberry. Gleason and Cronquist (1991) describe P. serotina as "[f]ormerly a forest tree, now abundant as a weed-tree of roadsides, waste land, and forest-margins". It is a moderately long-lived tree, with ages of up to 258 years known, though it is prone to storm damage, with branches breaking easily; any decay resulting, however, only progresses slowly. Seed production begins around 10 years of age, but does not become heavy until 30 years and continues up to 100 years or more. Germination rates are high, and the seeds are widely dispersed by birds and bears who eat the fruit and then excrete them. Some seeds however may remain in the soil bank and not germinate for as long as three years. All Prunus species have hard seeds that benefit from scarification to germinate (which in nature is produced by passing through an animal's digestive tract).

Deer browse the foliage.

Pests and diseases 

P. serotina is a host of caterpillars of various Lepidoptera. The eastern tent caterpillar defoliates entire groves some springs.

Uses 
Known as capolcuahuitl in Nahuatl (the source of the capuli epithet), it was an important food in pre-Columbian Mexico. Native Americans ate the fruit. Edible raw, the fruit is also made into jelly, and the juice can be used as a drink mixer, hence the common name 'rum cherry'.

Prunus serotina timber is valuable; perhaps the premier cabinetry timber of the U.S., traded as "cherry". High quality cherry timber is known for its strong orange hues, tight grain and high price. Low-quality wood, as well as the sap wood, can be more tan.

Prunus serotina was widely introduced into Western and Central Europe as an ornamental tree in the mid-20th century, where it has become locally naturalized. It has acted as an invasive species there, negatively affecting forest community biodiversity and regeneration.

Prunus serotina subsp. capuli was cultivated in Central and South America well before European contact.

References

External links 
 
 Flora of Pennsylvania

Bird cherries
serotina
Trees of the Northeastern United States
Trees of the Southeastern United States
Trees of Eastern Canada
Trees of Guatemala
Trees of Mexico
Flora of the Appalachian Mountains
Flora of the United States
Plants described in 1784
Taxa named by Jakob Friedrich Ehrhart
Flora of the Sierra Madre Occidental
Flora of the Sierra Madre Oriental
Flora of the Sierra Madre del Sur
Flora of the Trans-Mexican Volcanic Belt
Flora of the Sierra Madre de Oaxaca